Boris Ivanovich Tishin (2 January 1929 – 28 August 1980) was a boxer from  the Soviet Union. He competed for the Soviet Union in the 1952 Summer Olympics held in Helsinki, Finland in the light-middleweight event where, as a losing semifinalist, he was awarded a bronze medal.

References
Sports-reference

1929 births
1980 deaths
Soviet male boxers
Olympic boxers of the Soviet Union
Olympic bronze medalists for the Soviet Union
Boxers at the 1952 Summer Olympics
Olympic medalists in boxing
Russian male boxers
Medalists at the 1952 Summer Olympics
Light-middleweight boxers